The Church of San Esteban (Spanish: Iglesia Parroquial de San Esteban Protomártir) is a church located in Murillo de Río Leza, Spain. It was declared Bien de Interés Cultural in 1979.

References 

Bien de Interés Cultural landmarks in La Rioja (Spain)
Churches in La Rioja (Spain)